"I Just Had Sex" is a song by American comedy hip hop group The Lonely Island featuring American singer Akon and producer DJ Frank E. It was released as the first single from The Lonely Island's second album, Turtleneck & Chain, released in May 2011. The video, featured as a Saturday Night Live digital short, stars Akon and The Lonely Island members Andy Samberg, Jorma Taccone and briefly,  Akiva Schaffer, with guest appearances by Jessica Alba, Blake Lively  and John McEnroe.

Background
The Lonely Island, in the same fashion as the recording process for their debut, Incredibad, rented a house in Los Angeles and created a makeshift studio where they would record songs from that album.

Andy Samberg said that the song is "clearly from the perspective that the narrators are stunted". However, in countries such as Vietnam and Thailand, "I Just Had Sex" is played unironically in public. Akiva Schaffer remarked that "the nuance of the distinction would be lost if English wasn't your first language."

The music video for "I Just Had Sex" features Akon, Andy Samberg, and Jorma Taccone singing about how they just had sex with their unsatisfied girlfriends played by Blake Lively and Jessica Alba. The music video takes place in New York City atop the MetLife Building with the backdrops of the Empire State Building, Chrysler Building and the cityscape. Various other locations such as Central Park, a household, a bakery, a bathroom, a museum, a pub, and a girls' changing room are shown. The song features John McEnroe, first appearing at the line "Having sex can make a nice man of the meanest." The Lonely Island member Akiva Schaffer, who directed the video, also makes several appearances. The album's title is referenced when Jorma sings "she let me wear my chain and turtleneck sweater" while showing him wearing the same outfit that appears on the album cover. The music video ends with the trio launching fireworks from their crotches, parodying Katy Perry's "Firework" music video.

Charts

Weekly charts

Year-end charts

Certifications

References

External links

2010 singles
2010 songs
The Lonely Island songs
Akon songs
Universal Republic Records singles
Comedy rap songs
Dirty rap songs
Song recordings produced by DJ Frank E
Songs written by DJ Frank E
Songs written by Jerrod Bettis